Lawrence Parsons, 2nd Earl of Rosse (21 May 1758 – 24 February 1841), known as Sir Lawrence Parsons, Bt, from 1791 to 1807, was an Irish peer.

Parsons was the son of Sir William Parsons, 4th Baronet and Mary Clere. He succeeded his father in 1791 to the baronetcy and to Birr Castle, King's County (now known as County Offaly).

Between 1782 and 1790, he represented Dublin University in the Irish House of Commons. Parsons sat then as Member of Parliament (MP) for King's County from 1791 until the Act of Union in 1801. In the following co-option, he chose to sit for King's County also in the British House of Commons, a seat he held until 1807. In the latter year, he succeeded his uncle as second Earl of Rosse and Lord Oxmantown.

He also served as Governor of King's County from 1792 until the position was abolished in 1831.

In 1809, he became one of the Postmasters General of Ireland with Charles O'Neill, 1st Earl O'Neill, with whom he attended the laying of the foundation stone for the new General Post Office in Dublin on 12 August 1814 by the Lord Lieutenant of Ireland, Charles Whitworth, 1st Earl Whitworth. He later sat in the House of Lords as an Irish Representative Peer from 1809 until 1841 and served as Custos Rotulorum of King's County from 1828 until his death.

Marriage and children
He married Alice Lloyd, daughter of John Lloyd, on 1 May 1797. They had five children:

 Lady Jane Parsons (d. 31 December 1883)
 William Parsons, 3rd Earl of Rosse (b. 17 June 1800 – d. 31 October 1867)
 Hon. John Clere Parsons (b. 17 August 1802 – d. 10 August 1828)
 Hon. Laurence Parsons (b. 2 November 1805 – d. 22 November 1894)
 Lady Alicia Parsons (b. c. 1815 – d. 21 January 1885)

Jane Parsons married Arthur Edward Knox. They had two sons and three daughters.
One of the sons, Lawrence E. Knox founded the Irish Times.

References and sources
Notes

Sources
 
Kidd, Charles, Williamson, David (editors). Debrett's Peerage and Baronetage (1990 edition). New York: St Martin's Press, 1990, 

1758 births
1841 deaths
Auditors of the College Historical Society
Irish MPs 1790–1797
Irish MPs 1798–1800
Members of the Parliament of the United Kingdom for King's County constituencies (1801–1922)
UK MPs 1801–1802
UK MPs 1802–1806
UK MPs 1806–1807
UK MPs who inherited peerages
Irish representative peers
People from Birr, County Offaly
Members of the Privy Council of Ireland
Commissioners of the Treasury for Ireland
Members of the Parliament of Ireland (pre-1801) for Dublin University
Members of the Parliament of Ireland (pre-1801) for King's County constituencies
Earls of Rosse (1806 creation)
Postmasters General of Ireland